Abdourahim Moina Afia Alidi (born 17 December 2000) is a footballer who plays as a midfielder for the Comoros national football team. Born in France, he represents Comoros internationally.

Club career
After playing youth football for Red Star, Moina spent the 2017–18 season with their under-19 side before signing for Concarneau in summer 2018. He was released by Concarneau in summer 2021, having scored once in 29 league matches for the club.

International career
Born in Saint-Denis, France, Moina represents the Comoros national football team internationally, having received his first call-up in June 2021 for a 2021 FIFA Arab Cup qualification match against Palestine on 24 June. Moina made his debut for Comoros in that match against Palestine, with Moina playing 90 minutes as Comoros lost 5–1.

References

External links

2000 births
Living people
French footballers
Comorian footballers
French sportspeople of Comorian descent
Sportspeople from Saint-Denis, Seine-Saint-Denis
Association football midfielders
FCM Aubervilliers players
US Concarneau players
Championnat National players
Comoros international footballers
Footballers from Seine-Saint-Denis